The Radio Adventures of Eleanor Amplified is a children's podcast produced by WHYY.

Background 
The show follows a radio reporter named Eleanor during her investigations. The show has released three seasons. The podcast was produced by WHYY.  The show was created by John Sheehan who is the producer of Fresh Air. Common Sense Media gave the show a three star rating for children ages eight and older. The show debuted in the summer of 2016. The podcast was adapted into a book titled Eleanor Amplified and the Trouble with Mind Control. The show held the #1 spot on the iTunes charts in the Kids and Family category for five weeks. Emma Dibdin wrote in The New York Times that the show has "thrilling world-building". Melissa Locker compared the show to Little Orphan Annie and included the show in The Guardian's list of the best podcasts of 2016.

References 

Audio podcasts
2016 podcast debuts
2020 podcast endings
Scripted podcasts
Children's podcasts
American podcasts